Several ships of the Swedish Navy have been named HSwMS Carlskrona or HSwMS Karlskrona, named after the city of Karlskrona:

  was a ship launched in 1686 and sunk in 1730
  was a ship launched in 1694
  was a galley launched in 1749
  was a corvette launched in 1841 and sunk in 1846
  was a  launched in 1939 and decommissioned in 1974
  is a command ship launched in 1980 as the minelayer HSwMS Carlskrona (M04)

Swedish Navy ship names